Clay Weatherly (1910 in Harmon, Illinois – 30 May 1935 in Indianapolis, Indiana) was an American racecar driver. He was killed in the 1935 Indy 500.

Indy 500 results
Source:

References

See also
List of Indianapolis fatalities

Racing drivers who died while racing
Indianapolis 500 drivers
Sports deaths in Indiana
1910 births
1935 deaths
People from Lee County, Illinois
Racing drivers from Illinois